Lance X̱ʼunei Twitchell (born 1975) is an American scholar, poet, and language revitalization advocate. He works as an associate professor of Alaska Native Languages at the University of Alaska Southeast. He has written for "Molly of Denali".

X̱'unei Lance Twitchell was granted tenure in the Department of Humanities, School of Arts & Sciences at the UAS Juneau Campus in 2018.

He earned a Ph.D. in Hawaiian and indigenous language and culture revitalization from the Ka Haka ʻUla O Keʻelikōlani College of Hawaiian Language at the University of Hawaii at Hilo, an M.F.A. in creative writing from the University of Alaska Fairbanks, and a B.A. in English with a minor in American Indian studies from the University of Minnesota Twin Cities.

He serves on the state's Alaska Native Language Preservation & Advisory Council, appointed by the governor.

Awards and work

Awards 
 Top Forty Under 40 award, Alaska Journal of Commerce  (2013) 
 Judson L. Brown Leadership Award from Sealaska Heritage Institute  (2016)

 Contributions to Literacy in Alaska (CLIA) Awards, Alaska Center for the Book (2017)

 First Alaskan Institute Young Native Leader Award  (2020)

Poems 
 "Nanook Sweats," "Release, Definition: Trickster," "Ode to Tlingit, Yellow Hair Takes the Fat and We Lament His Seedy Departure," and "Dark Skin and Betraying Uncle," published in Yellow Medicine Review (Spring, 2009) 

 "Shaawatkʼeʼs Birth", co-author, filmed by Alaska Quarterly Review (2016)

Books 
 Haa Wsineix̲ Haa Yoo X̲'atángi  (Our language Saved Us): A Guidebook for Learning the Tlingit Language  
 Beginning Tlingit Workbook (2017)  

 Tlingit Reference Guide: Verbs, Grammar, Location & Direction, Concepts, Juneau, AK: Goldbelt Heritage Foundation, 2020

Chapters 
Tlingit use of marine space: putting up fish by Caskey Russell and X̱'unei Lance Twitchell

References 

1975 births
21st-century Native Americans
Alaska Native people
Language activists
Living people
Tlingit people
Yupik people